"Streets of Philadelphia" is a song written and performed by American rock musician Bruce Springsteen for the 1993 film Philadelphia, starring Tom Hanks, an early mainstream film dealing with HIV/AIDS. Released as a single in 1994, the song was a hit in many countries, including Austria, Canada, France, Germany, Iceland, Ireland, Italy, and Norway, where it topped the singles charts. In the United States, the single peaked at number nine on the Billboard Hot 100, becoming Springsteen's 12th and final top-10 hit.

The song received acclaim and went on to win the Academy Award for Best Original Song and four Grammy Awards: Song of the Year, Best Rock Song, Best Rock Vocal Performance, Solo, and Best Song Written Specifically for a Motion Picture or Television. In 2004, it finished at number 68 on AFI's 100 Years...100 Songs survey of top tunes in American cinema. The song is listed among the Rock and Roll Hall of Fame's 500 Songs that Shaped Rock and Roll.

Background and release
In early 1993, Philadelphia director Jonathan Demme asked Springsteen to write a song for his film, adding "I want it to play in the malls." Springsteen replied, "Well, I'm interested, so I'd like to come up with a song for you. If you give me some time, I'll see, but I can't promise." Springsteen recalled adding, "I'm not very good at scores". In late August, after the conclusion of the "Other Band" Tour, he recorded a demo of his completed song at Thrill Hill Recording, Beverly Hills, California (his home studio), supplying all of the instrumentation. He mailed the tape to Demme, who later said, "my wife and I sat down and listened to it, and we were literally weeping by the end". Meanwhile, background vocals were added by Tommy Sims (from the "Other Band"). In October, Springsteen recorded it at A&M Studios in Los Angeles, with Sims, Ornette Coleman on saxophone, and vocals by "Little" Jimmy Scott. It was mixed by Bob Clearmountain, included in the soundtrack, and the video was shot. However, in mid-December, Springsteen suddenly replaced it with his home demo from August, re-shooting some video scenes to eliminate Scott. The four-man combo version can be heard in a brief scene in the film when Tom Hanks exits Denzel Washington's office, but it was Springsteen alone playing over the opening credits. "Streets of Philadelphia" was released on February 2, 1994, as the first single from the film's original soundtrack, with Springsteen singing and playing all the instruments and Tommy Sims on background vocals, and became a chart success worldwide.

"Streets of Philadelphia" achieved greater popularity in Europe than in the United States. While it peaked at number nine on the Billboard Hot 100 chart, it became a number-one single in Germany, France and Austria. It peaked at number two in the United Kingdom, becoming Springsteen's highest charting hit in Britain, and number four in Australia. , "Streets of Philadelphia" ranks as his most recent top ten hit. The song was included on the album All Time Greatest Movie Songs, released by Sony in 1999.

Critical reception
Larry Flick from Billboard wrote, "Springsteen's empathetic lyrics and performance zoom straight for the heart, traveling atop a slow and sturdy beat and pillowy synths. A powerful song with or without the image of the film to support it." Troy J. Augusto from Cash Box named it Pick of the Week, describing it as an "appropriately somber song". He said, "Written in the first person, this slow-moving ballad documents the struggle of a downtrodden and forgotten soul left to wander the dark streets, out of sight of an uncaring society. Like Hanks' character in the film, Springsteen's unfortunate draws on our sympathy, not because he asks for help but because he appears unable to help himself, an important distinction. One of The Boss’ best." Kent Zimmerman from the Gavin Report concluded, "Bruce Springsteen's custom-written theme is as scary a portrait of AIDS as you're likely to hear all year long. Combining the gruesome fears of urban abandonment coupled with the tragedy of a fatal disease in just one song is surely a miracle of subtlety."  

Robert Hilburn from Los Angeles Times deemed it "a moving ballad about a man whose body is being destroyed by AIDS", and "a work that shows Springsteen, despite all the questions raised by changes in his life in recent years, can still write purposeful songs that connect on a deeply emotional level." He added, "Springsteen sings in a voice that expresses the helplessness and heartache of someone dying of AIDS as convincingly as Springsteen once conveyed the dreams and aspirations of youth." In his weekly UK chart commentary, James Masterton said, "However good it may be the brooding ballad is hardly classic Bruce and can be expected to shuttle rapidly out next week". A reviewer from Music & Media commented, "The man who used to walk upon E-Street, now roams the Philly lanes. This synth-dominated track from the OST Philadelphia revives the "etherealism" of Tunnel Of Love." Neil Spencer from The Observer felt Bruce Springsteen's "sombre" "Streets of Philadelphia" "reflects a dark night of the soul as the disease takes hold". Pete Stanton of Smash Hits gave the song four out of five, writing, "This is far gentler, far lovelier and far nicer than anything he's done for ages. Taken from the excellent film [...], this should see Bruce back in the charts."

Music video
The accompanying music video for the song, directed by Jonathan Demme and his nephew Ted Demme in December 1993, begins by showing Springsteen walking along desolate city streets, followed by a bustling park and schoolyard, interspersed with footage from the film. After a quick shot of Rittenhouse Square, it ends with Springsteen walking along the Delaware River, with the Benjamin Franklin Bridge in the background. Tom Hanks is also visible as the lead character he plays in the film, looking on as Bruce begins the final verse. One newspaper review called it "the saddest track cut this decade".

The vocal track for the video was recorded live with a hidden microphone, to a pre-recorded instrumental track. This technique, appropriate for emotionally intense songs for which conventional video lip-syncing would seem especially false, was used by John Mellencamp in part on his 1985 "Rain on the Scarecrow" video, and by Springsteen, in his 1987 "Brilliant Disguise" video, singing the song directly into the camera as he sits on the edge of his chair on a Sandy Hook, New Jersey sound stage.

Live performances
Because of the song's sterling achievements in the awards world, Springsteen played the song live in three high-visibility, prime-time awards show broadcasts: at the 66th Academy Awards in March 1994, at the MTV Video Music Awards in September 1994, and at the Grammy Awards of 1995 in March 1995.  Between this, Philadelphias strong box office performance, and the single being a top 10 pop hit, "Streets of Philadelphia" became one of Springsteen's best-known songs to the general music audience.

Nonetheless, Springsteen went on to perform the song only sparingly in his own concerts. In solo guitar form and missing the song's trademark synthesizers-and-drums feel, it was performed semi-regularly on the solo and stark 1995–1997 Ghost of Tom Joad Tour. After that, the song became a rarity, only appearing a dozen times on the 1999–2000 E Street Band Reunion Tour, and, as of January 2016, only a few times across the nine tours after that.

Accolades

Track listings
 CD , 7-inch, and cassette single "Streets of Philadelphia" – 3:15
 "If I Should Fall Behind" – 4:43

 CD maxi and maxi cassette'''
 "Streets of Philadelphia" – 3:15
 "If I Should Fall Behind" – 4:43
 "Growin' Up" – 3:13
 "The Big Muddy" – 4:11

The B-sides were selected from the previous year's live album In Concert/MTV Plugged.

Personnel
 Bruce Springsteen – vocals, keyboards, drum machine
 Tommy Sims – background vocals

Charts

Weekly charts

Year-end charts

Decade-end charts

Certifications

Release history

Cover versions
The song has been covered live by Jack Folland, Tori Amos, Melissa Etheridge, David Gray, Waxahatchee and Lonely the Brave. Recorded covers have been released by Ray Conniff (on his 1997 album, I Love Movies), Casiotone for the Painfully Alone, Marah, Liv Kristine, Molly Johnson, Bettye LaVette, SALEM, Gregorian and I Muvrini with Anggun. Philadelphia rappers, Cassidy & the Larsiny Family have made a cover of this song on the Put Ya L in the Sky mixtape, in an effort to stop crime in the city. French artist Patrick Bruel and U2 covered the song, translating the lyrics into French while retaining the music.

After the movie Philadelphia was released, many artists covered it. In 1993, when Rhino Records assembled its box set, Academy Award Winning Songs (1934–1993), the same year, it was unable to license the Springsteen track and instead commissioned Richie Havens to record a cover version.

In 2010, the French string quartet Quatuor Ébène recorded a version on their album Fiction, with drummer Richard Héry, sung by the quartet's violist Mathieu Herzog.

The song is also covered by The Fray on their album Scars and Stories, released in 2012.

In 2011, the German group Gregorian released a Gregorian chant version of the song in their album Masters of Chant Chapter VIII.

Also in 2011, Idols South Africa season seven winner Dave van Vuuren performed the song on the show and recorded it on his album Free the Animals.

In 2009, it was covered by Luis Eduardo Aute in Catalan as "Els carrers de Philadelphia", for the CD of TV3's telethon La Marató.

In February 2013, Sir Elton John performed the song at the National Academy of Recording Arts and Sciences tribute concert honoring Bruce Springsteen as the 2013 MusiCares Person of the Year.

Fat White Family's Saul Adamczewski and Childhood (band)'s Ben Romans-Hopcraft, covered the song on their 2018 album, Karaoke for One: Vol 1, under the band name Insecure Men.

Waxahatchee covered the song in 2021 for the deluxe issue of her 2020 album Saint Cloud''.

See also

 List of number-one hits of 1994 (Austria)
 List of RPM number-one singles of 1994
 List of European number-one hits of 1994
 List of number-one hits of 1994 (France)
 List of number-one hits of 1994 (Germany)
 List of number-one singles of 1994 (Ireland)
 List of 1964–1994 number-one hits in Norway

References

External links
 Brucebase history of song
 [ "Streets of Philadelphia" review at Allmusic]
 [ Information on the "Streets of Philadelphia" single at Allmusic]
 

1993 songs
1994 singles
1990s ballads
Best Original Song Academy Award-winning songs
Best Original Song Golden Globe winning songs
Bruce Springsteen songs
Columbia Records singles
Culture of Philadelphia
European Hot 100 Singles number-one singles
Grammy Award for Best Male Rock Vocal Performance
Grammy Award for Best Rock Song
Grammy Award for Best Song Written for Visual Media
Grammy Award for Song of the Year
Irish Singles Chart number-one singles
Number-one singles in Austria
Number-one singles in Germany
Number-one singles in Iceland
Number-one singles in Italy
Number-one singles in Norway
Rock ballads
RPM Top Singles number-one singles
SNEP Top Singles number-one singles
Song recordings produced by Jon Landau
Songs about Philadelphia
Songs about HIV/AIDS
Songs about streets
Songs written by Bruce Springsteen
Songs written for films